Victor Raúl González (born December 27, 1973) is a former professional baseball outfielder. He batted and threw right-handed.

Career
Drafted by the Kansas City Royals in the 17th round of the 1990 Major League Baseball Draft, González made his major league debut for the Chicago Cubs on May 25, . In , he played for the New York Mets' Triple-A affiliate, the New Orleans Zephyrs where he batted .279 in 17 games before being released. He then signed with the independent Newark Bears of the Atlantic League. He hit .313 with Newark with 8 home runs and 35 RBI.

Following the arrest of Major League Baseball player, Miguel Cabrera, on February 15, 2010, González was chosen as Cabrera's "companion" in order to help the slugger abstain from alcohol and other such activities detrimental to his baseball career.  González was reported by Fox Sports to be going to be with Cabrera "all year long" to ensure he stays on track.

References

External links

1973 births
Living people
Águilas de Mexicali players
Appleton Foxes players
Atenienses de Manatí (baseball) players
Buffalo Bisons (minor league) players
Calgary Vipers players
Cangrejeros de Santurce (baseball) players
Chicago Cubs players
Cincinnati Reds players
Cleveland Indians players
Gigantes de Carolina players
Guerreros de Oaxaca players
Gulf Coast Royals players
Indianapolis Indians players
International League MVP award winners
Iowa Cubs players
Leones de Ponce players
Liga de Béisbol Profesional Roberto Clemente outfielders
Long Island Ducks players
Louisville Bats players
Louisville RiverBats players
Major League Baseball outfielders
Major League Baseball players from Puerto Rico
Memphis Redbirds players
Mexican League baseball outfielders
New Orleans Zephyrs players
New York Mets players
Newark Bears players
Norfolk Tides players
Olmecas de Tabasco players
People from Santurce, Puerto Rico
Piratas de Campeche players
Puerto Rican expatriate baseball players in Canada
Puerto Rican expatriate baseball players in Mexico
Tecolotes de Nuevo Laredo players
Tiburones de La Guaira players
Puerto Rican expatriate baseball players in Venezuela
Trenton Thunder players
Vaqueros Laguna players
Wichita Wingnuts players
Wichita Wranglers players
Wilmington Blue Rocks players
Puerto Rican expatriate baseball players in Taiwan